The Curtiss V-2 Type 3 (V-2-3) was a liquid-cooled V8 aircraft engine.

Specifications
Data from: Aerofiles Powerplants

References

V-2
1920s aircraft piston engines